Néstor Guillén Olmos (28 January 1890 – 12 March 1966) was a Bolivian lawyer and politician who served as the 40th president of Bolivia on a de facto interim basis in 1946.

Background and earlier career
Born in La Paz, Guillén studied law and rose to become the dean of the Superior District Court of La Paz.

President of Bolivia
Néstor Guillén served as President of Bolivia for 27 days between July and August 1946, following the overthrow and assassination of President Gualberto Villarroel (1943–46). Upon the death of Villarroel, the alliance of forces that had toppled him needed a reliable and impartial caretaker (given the mood of the citizenry, which had just shown what it was capable of during the revolt) to guide the country to elections. They settled on the head of the La Paz Court of Appeals, Tomás Monje Gutiérrez, who was ill at the time. Thus, Guillén filled in for him for fewer than four weeks, whereupon Monje was sworn-in as President. The old oligarchy was established again but, not long after, would fall only a few years later.

Later career and death
Guillén then returned to his judgeship and died on 12 March 1966 in La Paz, Bolivia.

See also 

 Government of Néstor Guillén, 1946

Sources 
Mesa José de; Gisbert, Teresa; and Carlos D. Mesa, "Historia De Bolivia", 3rd edition., pp. 577–578.

1890 births
1966 deaths
Presidents of Bolivia
People from La Paz
20th-century Bolivian judges